Jessica Millward is an American historian who focuses on African American history, early America, African diaspora, slavery, and gender. Her work focuses on the female slave experience by emphasizing narratives of black women during slavery.

Early life 
Jessica Millward was born in American Fork, Utah. She was raised in West Valley City, near Salt Lake City, in a Mormon household.

Education 
At the University of Utah, Millward majored in history and minored in African American studies to earn her bachelor's degree. After completing her bachelor's degree, a four-year scholarship was awarded to Millward to teach in secondary school in Utah. However, Millward decided to attend the University of California, Los Angeles, where she received her master's degree in African American studies and where she earned her doctorate. Millward was the first person on either side of her family to attend college and earn her Ph.D.

Maya Angelou's book, I Know Why the Caged Bird Sings, first sparked Millward's interest in studying African American history. Once in her master's program, Brenda Stevenson became an advisor to Millward. Stevenson's research intrigued Millward and encouraged her to study the slave experience. Newly learned knowledge from personal accounts and interacting with Stevenson's research became the foundation to Millward's book, Finding Charity's Folk.

Career 

Millward is an associate professor in the history department in the School of Humanities at the University of California, Irvine. Before teaching at the University of California, Irvine, she taught African American history at the University of Illinois at Urbana–Champaign.

While at the University of California, Irvine, Millward founded the UCI Ghana Project, a research exchange program between the University of California, Irvine and the University of Ghana.

Millward is involved with professional societies such as the American Historical Association, Association for the Study of the World Wide African Diaspora, Organization of American Historians, Association of Black Women Historians, Association for the Study of African American Life and History, Southern Association of Women Historians, Maryland Historical Society, and Delta Sigma Theta.

Awards and honors 

Some of Millward's honors include: 
 Association of American University Women Post Doctoral Fellowship, 2006–2007
 Lord Baltimore Fellowship, Maryland Historical Society, Baltimore, MD, 2004–2006
 Chancellor's Postdoctoral Fellow, African-American Studies and Research
 Program, University of Illinois, Urbana-Champaign, 2003–2004
 Nathan Huggins/Benjamin Quarles Dissertation Research Award, Organization of American Historians, 2003
 Research Fellow, David Library of the American Revolution, Washington
 Crossing, PA, 2001–2002
 Recipient of the Association of Black Women's Historians Letitia Woods Brown Award for best article on African American Women's History, 2007

Works 
Finding Charity’s Folk is a book written by Millward and published by the University of Georgia Press in December 2015. Finding Charity's Folk encompasses oral history, artifacts, photos, and personal accounts acquired over 15 years of research to share the narrative of enslaved women who had been silenced.

References

External links

University of California, Irvine faculty

Living people
Year of birth missing (living people)